San Marino has a multi-party system, with numerous parties in which no one party often has a chance of gaining power alone, and parties must work with each other to form coalition governments.

The parties

Parties with official representation
Parties with representation in the Great and General Council:

San Marino Common Good
Sammarinese Christian Democratic Party (Partito Democratico Cristiano Sammarinese)
We Sammarineses (Noi Sammarinesi)
Party of Socialists and Democrats (Partito dei Socialisti e dei Democratici)
Popular Alliance (Alleanza Popolare)

Agreement for the Country
Union for the Republic (Unione Per la Repubblica)
Socialist Party (Partito Socialista)
Sammarinese Moderates (Moderati Sammarinesi)

Other parties
RETE Movement
For San Marino
San Marino 3.0
Sammarinese Democratic Party (Partito Democratico Sammarinese) 
San Marino of Values (San Marino dei Valori)
Sammarinese Movement Social Right (Movimento Sammarinese Destra Sociale)

Defunct parties
Arengo and Freedom (Arengo e Libertà)
Centre Democrats (Democratici di Centro)
City and Territory (Città e Territorio)
Civic 10 (Civico 10)
Committee for the Defense of the Republic (Comitato per la Difesa della Repubblica)
Committee of Freedom (Comitato della Libertà)
Democratic Agreement - Republican Party (Intesa Democratica - Partito Repubblicano)
Democratic Reformers (Riformisti Democratici)
Democratic Sammarinese Union (Unione Sammarinese Democratica)
Democratic Movement (Movimento Democratico)
Democratic Socialist Left (Sinistra Socialista Democratica)
Democratic Union (Unione Democratica)
Euro-Populars for San Marino (Europopolari per San Marino)
Left Party (Partito della Sinistra)
Marxist-Leninist Communist Movement (Movimento Comunista Marxista-Leninista)
Movement for Constitutional Freedoms (Movimento per le Libertà Statuarie)
New Socialist Party (Nuovo Partito Socialista)
Party of Democrats (Partito dei Democratici)
Popular Democratic Party (Partito Democratico Popolare)
Republican Fasces of San Marino (Fascio Repubblicano di San Marino)
Sammarinese Independent Democratic Socialist Party (Partito Socialista Democratico Indipendente Sammarinese)
Sammarinese Communist Party (Partito Comunista Sammarinese)
Sammarinese Communist Refoundation (Rifondazione Comunista Sammarinese)
Sammarinese Democratic Progressive Party (Partito Progressista Democratico Sammarinese)
Sammarinese Democratic Socialist Party (Partito Socialista Democratico Sammarinese)
Sammarinese Democratic Union (Unione Sammarinese Democratica)
Sammarinese Fascist Party (Partito Fascista Sammarinese)
Sammarineses for Freedom (Sammarinesi per la Libertà)
Sammarinese National Alliance (Alleanza Nazionale Sammarinese)
Sammarinese Populars (Popolari Sammarinesi)
Sammarinese Popular Party (Partito Popolare Sammarinese)
Sammarinese Reformist Socialist Party (Partito Socialista Riformista Sammarinese)
Sammarinese Republican Party (Partito Repubblicano Sammarinese)
Sammarinese Socialist Party (Partito Socialista Sammarinese)
Sammarinese Union of Moderates (Unione Sammarinese dei Moderati)
Socialists – Ideas in Motion (Socialisti – Idee in Movimento)
Socialists for Reform (Socialisti per le Riforme)
Unitary Socialist Party (Partito Socialista Unitario)
United Left (Sinistra Unita)
White-blue Movement (Movimento Biancoazzurro)

Former coalitions
Pact for San Marino (Patto per San Marino)
Reforms and Freedom (Riforme e Libertà)

See also
 Politics of San Marino
 List of political parties by country

San Marino
 
San Marino
Political parties
Parties